Brian Dorman (2 July 1937 – 27 July 2012) was an Australian rules footballer who played with Collingwood in the Victorian Football League (VFL).

Notes

External links 

1937 births
2012 deaths
Australian rules footballers from Victoria (Australia)
Collingwood Football Club players